Acoustic homing is a system which uses the acoustic signature (sound) of a target to guide a moving object, such as a torpedo. Acoustic homing can be either passive or active in nature. Using passive homing, the system is designed to move either toward or away from a sound, and may also be designed to move only toward certain types of sounds to the exclusion of others, while active homing makes use of active sonar. The system emits a sound pulse that reflects off objects and then back to the system, where the system processes the echos to determine the proper response.

Method
An object can be equipped with two or more acoustic transducers, which function as speakers and microphones.  If a transducer receives a sound louder than that received by the other transducer, the object turns in the transducer's direction. If the object is to manoeuvre in three-dimensional space, more than two transducers are needed. Typically, more than three transducers are used, and arrays of over 100 are not unknown. A large number of transducers allows for more accurate steering.

Uses

Acoustic homing is useful in weapons, specifically acoustic torpedoes.  Torpedoes can be steered toward targeted ships using acoustic homing.

See also
Acoustic quieting
Guidance system
Acoustic torpedo

 
Weapon guidance